Scoparia staudingeralis is a species of moth in the family Crambidae. It is found on the Iberian Peninsula, Corsica, Sardinia and in France, Switzerland and Greece, as well as on Crete and Cyprus.

References

Moths described in 1869
Scorparia
Moths of Europe